The following is a list of notable alumni of the Catholic University of America, the national university of the Roman Catholic Church in the United States, located in Washington, D.C.

There are several names that could appear on this list twice, but will only appear in the area for which they are best known.  For example, several in the Arts category could appear in more than one subcategory.  Others could appear in several categories but have been relegated to one.

Alumni

Religion

Beati and other Servants of God
Thea Bowman, FSPA,  1969, and a Ph.D. in 1972, Servant of God, M.A. in English
Theodore Foley, CP, 1943 and STD, 1944, Servant of God, Passionist priest and Superior General; STL
Emil J. Kapaun, Master of Arts in education, 1948, Servant of God, priest, World War II and Korean War US Army chaplain, US Medal of Honor recipient
Fulton J. Sheen, 1920, and faculty from 1926 to 1950 in theology and philosophy, Venerable, J.C.B., Auxiliary Bishop of New York and Bishop of Rochester, host of Life is Worth Living

Cardinals
Joseph Bernardin, Archbishop of Chicago
Raymond Leo Burke, Patron of the Sovereign Military Order of Malta and Archbishop Emeritus of Saint Louis
Terence Cooke, M.A., 1949 and M.S.W., 1949, Servant of God, Archbishop of New York
Blase J. Cupich, S.T.L. 1979, S.T.D. 1987, Archbishop of Chicago
Daniel DiNardo, B.A., M.A., Archbishop of Galveston-Houston
Timothy Dolan, Ph.D., 1985, Archbishop of New York
Francis George, M.A., 1966, Archbishop of Chicago
Patrick Joseph Hayes, S.T.L., 1894, Archbishop of New York
James Hickey, S.T.L., 1946, Archbishop of Washington
Lubomyr Husar, Ukrainian Greek Major Archbishop of Kyiv and Halych
John Krol, J.C.D., 1942, Archbishop of Philadelphia
Roger Mahony, M.S.W., 1964, Archbishop of Los Angeles
Theodore McCarrick, Ph.D., 1963, Archbishop of Washington
Humberto Sousa Medeiros, M.A., 1942, S.T.L., 1946, Archbishop of Boston
Sean O'Malley, O.F.M.Cap., Ph.D., 1978, Archbishop of Boston
Justin Rigali, S.T.B. 1961, Archbishop of Philadelphia
Jan Pieter Schotte, Secretary General of the Synod of Bishops and President of the Labour Office of the Apostolic See
Luis Antonio Tagle, S.T.L. 1987, S.T.D. 1991 Prefect for the Congregation for the Evangelization of Peoples
Donald Wuerl, M.A., 1962, Archbishop of Washington

Bishops
David William Antonio, S.T.D. 1999, Bishop of Ilagan
Gerald Barbarito, J.C.L. 1983, Bishop of Palm Beach
J. Kevin Boland, Bishop of Savannah
Earl Boyea, Ph.D. 1987, Bishop of Lansing
Michael J. Bransfield, M.Phil. 1973, Bishop emeritus of Wheeling-Charleston
Robert J. Carlson, J.C.L. 1979, Archbishop of St. Louis, Missouri
Charles J. Chaput, Archbishop of Philadelphia
David R. Choby, Bishop of Nashville
John Bosco Manat Chuabsamai, M.A. 1977, Bishop of Ratchaburi, Thailand
Robert J. Cunningham, J.C.L. 1978, Bishop of Ogdensburg, New York
Edward Celestin Daly, OP, J.C.D. 1923, Bishop of Des Moines
Bohdan Danylo, 1996, Bishop of Saint Josaphat in Parma
Frank J. Dewane, M.A. 1975, Bishop of Venice in Florida
Maurice John Dingman, J.C.L. 1946, Bishop of Des Moines
Pierre DuMaine, D.Ed. 1961, Bishop of San Jose
Fidelis Fernando, Ph.D. 1987, Bishop of Mannar
Raphael M. Fliss, S.T.L., former Bishop of Superior
Roger J. Foys, Bishop of Covington, Kentucky
John Mark Gannon, S.T.B. 1900, S.T.L. 1901, Archbishop of Erie
Francis Joseph Gossman, J.C.D. 1959, Bishop of Raleigh
Francis J. Haas, Bishop of Grand Rapids, 1943–1953
Bernard J. Harrington, Ed.M. 1958, Bishop of Winona
Charles M. Jarrell, B.A. 1962, M.A. 1963, Bishop of Lafayette, Louisiana
William Michael Joensen, Ph.D. 2001, Bishop of Des Moines
James Vann Johnston, Jr., J.C.L. 1996, Bishop of Springfield–Cape Girardeau, Bishop of Kansas City–Saint Joseph
Donald Joseph Kettler, J.C.L. 1982, Bishop of Fairbanks
Daniel Kucera, OSB, M.A., Ph.D. 1954,  Bishop of Salina, Archbishop of Dubuque
John J. Leibrecht, Ph.D. 1961, Bishop Emeritus of Springfield–Cape Girardeau
Oscar Hugh Lipscomb, Ph.D. 1963, Archbishop Emeritus of Mobile
Martin N. Lohmuller, J.C.D. 1947, Auxiliary Bishop of Philadelphia
William E. Lori, S.T.D. 1982, Archbishop of Baltimore
Paul Loverde, J.C.L. 1982, Bishop of Arlington
Henry J. Mansell, Archbishop of Hartford
John Joseph Mitty, S.T.B., 1907, Archbishop of San Francisco
Robert F. Morneau, Auxiliary Bishop of Green Bay
Robert W. Muench, Ed.M. 1968, Bishop of Baton Rouge
Michael Joseph Murphy, S.T.L. 1942, Bishop of Erie
James A. Murray, J.C.L. 1964, Bishop Emeritus of Kalamazoo
George H. Niederauer, S.T.B. 1960, Archbishop of San Francisco
David M. O'Connell, J.C.L. 1987, J.C.D. 1990, Bishop of Trenton
Stuart France O'Connell SM, MA 1984, Fifth Catholic Bishop of Rarotonga, Cook Islands (1996–present)
Michael F. Olson, MA 1989, Bishop of Fort Worth
Wolodymyr Paska, J.C.D. 1975, Auxiliary Bishop of Philadelphia (Ukrainian)
Joseph Perry, J.C.L. 1981, Auxiliary Bishop of Chicago
John C. Reiss, J.C.D. 1954, Bishop of Trenton
John H. Ricard, Ph.D., Bishop of Pensacola-Tallahassee
Thomas J. Rodi, J.C.L. 1986, Archbishop of Mobile
Henry Rohlman, MA 1907, Bishop of Davenport, Archbishop of Dubuque
Dennis Schnurr, J.C.D. 1980, Archbishop of Cincinnati
John Mortimer Smith, S.T.B. 1961, J.C.D. 1966, Bishop of Trenton
Stefan Soroka, B.S.T. 1982, D.S.W., 1985, Metropolitan Archbishop of the Ukrainian Greek-Catholic Church in the United States
John J. Ward, J.C.L. 1952, Auxiliary Bishop of Los Angeles
Loras Joseph Watters, S.T.L. 1941, Ph.D. 1954, Auxiliary Bishop of Dubuque, Bishop of Winona
Thomas Jerome Welsh,  Bishop of Arlington and Bishop of Allentown
Aloysius John Wycislo, Bishop of Green Bay
Gabino Zavala, J.C.L., Auxiliary Bishop of Los Angeles
Thomas Zinkula, M.A., 1990, Bishop of Davenport

Priests
 Nancy Ledins, priest and member of the Missionaries of the Precious Blood who later came out as a transgender woman.

Public service and politics

Federal
Charlene Barshefsky, J.D.1975, Ambassador, United States Trade Representative under Bill Clinton 
Robert Patrick Casey, Jr., J.D. 1988, U.S. Senator from Pennsylvania
Jeffrey Chiesa, J.D., 1990, U.S. Senator from New Jersey
Thomas E. Donilon,  B.A., 1977, National Security Advisor
Edward W. Gillespie, B.A. 1983, former Chairman of the Republican National Committee
Patrick Guerriero, B.A. 1990, executive director of the Log Cabin Republicans
Luis Guinot, former United States Ambassador to Costa Rica
Thomas R. Harkin, J.D. 1972, U.S. Senator from Iowa
John P. Hart, president and CEO of the American Democracy Institute
Kathy Hochul, J.D., 1984, U.S. Representative and Governor of New York
Sara Dunlap Jackson, National Archives and Records Administration archivist, Military Archives Division
Emmett Joseph Leahy (1910–1964), American archivist and entrepreneur, pioneer in the discipline of records management.
Thomas P. Melady, Ph.D. 1955, former U.S. Ambassador to the Holy See, Burundi, and Uganda
Jack Miller, United States Senator from Iowa
Richard G. Renzi, J.D. 2002, U.S. Congressman from Arizona
Kathleen Rice, B.A. 1987, U.S. Congressman from New York State
John E. Straub, B.A. 1991, Director of the White House Office of Administration
Robert Francis Anthony Studds, B.S. 1917, United States Coast and Geodetic Survey Corps admiral and engineer, fourth Director of the United States Coast and Geodetic Survey
Robert Tiernan, J.D. 1956, U.S. Congressman from Rhode Island
Genevievette Walker-Lightfoot, J.D. 1999, former U.S. Securities and Exchange Commission attorney

State
Forrest H. Anderson, J.D. 1938, former Governor of Montana
Martin Connor, B.A., J.D., former New York State Senate Minority Leader
Bob Duckworth, B.A., Clerk of the Circuit Court for Anne Arundel County, Maryland
Ryan Fecteau, B.A., 2014, Maine House of Representatives
Reed Gusciora, B.A., New Jersey General Assemblyman
Mitchell J. Landrieu, B.A. 1982, Mayor of New Orleans and former Lieutenant Governor of Louisiana
Agnes Mary Mansour, president of Mercy College of Detroit 1971–1983, director of the Michigan Department of Community Health 1983–1987
Terence R. McAuliffe, B.A. 1979, former Governor of Virginia and former Chairman of the Democratic National Committee
Jim McGreevey, attended but did not graduate, former Governor of New Jersey
Daniel O'Donnell, New York State Assembly Member
Martin O'Malley, B.A. 1985, former mayor of Baltimore, Maryland and former Governor of Maryland
Brian E. Rumpf, B.A., New Jersey General Assemblyman
Holly Schepisi, B.A. New Jersey General Assemblywoman
Henry P. Sullivan (1916-2003), B.A., Democratic state representative and senator in New Hampshire
William J. Shea, J.D. 1926, Connecticut Supreme Court justice
Brandon Umba, B.A. 2008, New Jersey General Assemblyman

Local
Joseph Alioto, 1940, mayor of San Francisco
Daniel G. Birmingham, B.A 1990, J.D. 1995, County Legislator of Putnam County, New York
Joseph H. Gainer 1902, 26th mayor of Providence, Rhode Island

Other (public service and politics)
Thomasina Jordan, Ed.D., American Indian activist
Hani Miletski, Israeli Senior Representative of the Defense Mission to the U.S. for Strategic Defense Initiative Programs
Jerome G. Miller, D.S.W., 1965, advocate for alternatives to incarceration and the deinstitutionalization of persons with developmental disabilities
Tom G. Palmer, M.A., Senior Fellow at the Cato Institute and director of the institute's educational division
Timothy Perry Shriver, M.A. 1989, CEO of the Special Olympics
Jesús Permuy, Cuban-American Human Rights activist, urban planner, and community leader
Aurelia Pucinski, Illinois judge 
James Soong, M.S. 1971, Taiwanese politician and founder of the People First Party

Arts and letters

Film and television
Susan Anspach, 1961, did not graduate, actress
Norma Candal, actress and comedian
Pat Carroll, B.A. 1989, Emmy Award-winning actress, voice of Ursula in Disney’s The Little Mermaid
Mary Alice Dwyer-Dobbin, television producer
Marc Gervais, M.F.A. 1960, Jesuit, writer, film consultant, film professor at Concordia University 1967-2003
Henry Gibson, cast member of Rowan and Martin's Laugh-In
John Heard, actor, Peter McCallister from the first two Home Alone films
Saeed Jaffrey, Indian actor and Fulbright scholar
Laurence Luckinbill, M.F.A. 1958, Emmy Award-winning producer, writer, actor
John Carroll Lynch, actor, played Drew Carey's brother on The Drew Carey Show
Ed McMahon, B.A. 1949, announcer on The Tonight Show Starring Johnny Carson and host of Star Search
Kathleen McInerney, B.A., voice actress, Ash Ketchum seasons 1–8 on Pokémon
David L. Paterson, B.A., 1989, producer and screenwriter of Disney's Bridge to Terabithia
Colleen Zenk Pinter, Emmy Award-winning actress, known for her role on As the World Turns
Chris Sarandon, M.F.A., actor, best known for his portrayal of Prince Humperdinck in The Princess Bride (film)
Susan Sarandon, B.A. 1968, Academy Award-winning actress who played Janet in The Rocky Horror Picture Show.
John Slattery, B.F.A. 1984, actor
Jon Voight, B.A. 1960, actor who won an Academy Award as best actor in Coming Home (1978 film)
Lisa Ann Walter, who played Chessy in the 1998 remake of The Parent Trap (1998 film), which also starred Lindsay Lohan.

Media
Maureen B. Dowd, B.A. 1973, columnist for The New York Times
Mary Alice Dwyer-Dobbin, M.F.A. 1967, CEO, Procter & Gamble Productions (producers of As the World Turns and Guiding Light)
Julie Nixon Eisenhower, M.A. 1972, author
Alfred Gough, B.A. 1989, Executive Producer of WB’s Smallville, co-wrote screenplay for Spider-Man 2
John Harrington, photographer, author
Michael J. Hurd, M.A. 1985, radio commentator
Kathryn Jean Lopez, B.A. 1997, editor-at-large, National Review Online
Scott P. Richert, M.A. 1992, Publisher, Our Sunday Visitor
Rosanna Scotto, B.F.A. 1980, co-anchor of FOX-5 News (New York)
Dennis Wholey, B.A. 1959, host of This is America with Dennis Wholey
Brian Williams, attended briefly but did not graduate, anchor, NBC Nightly News

Theatre
John Aler, B.M. 1971, M.M. 1972, tenor, eight-time Grammy winner
Harolyn M. Blackwell, B.M. 1977, M.M. 1980, soprano, Metropolitan Opera
Walter Bobbie, dancer, choreographer, director and actor
Philip Bosco, B.A. 1957, Tony Award-winning actor
Fabiana Bravo, Argentine operatic soprano, Metropolitan Opera
Mart Crowley, playwright
Rose Hemingway, stage actress, How to Succeed In Business Without Really Trying on Broadway
George Herman, M.F.A 1954, playwright
Jean Kerr, M.F.A., Pulitzer-winning playwright and author
Jason Miller, Pulitzer Prize-winning playwright (1973). He also starred as Father Damien Karras in the movie The Exorcist. 
Donn B. Murphy, M.F.A. 1954, President of National Theatre Washington, DC; Distinguished Professor of Theatre, Georgetown University
 Michael Murray, B.A. 1954, co-founder and Artistic Director of Charles Playhouse (Boston); Artistic Director of Cincinnati Playhouse in the Park; Chair of Department of Theatre Arts, Brandeis University
Tracy Lynn Olivera, B.M. 1999, actress
Joe Plummer, B.A. 1954, actor and playwright
Gerome Ragni, musical writer and actor
Frances Sternhagen, Broadway, film and television actress
Paula Vogel, B.A. 1974, Pulitzer Prize-winning playwright

Other (arts)
Mark Adamo, B.M., 1990, composer
Yazmany Arboleda, School of Architecture and Planning, 2005, installation artist
Antonella Barba, contestant on the 6th season of American Idol
David C. Driskell, M.F.A. 1962, visual artist and curator
Joseph Fitzmartin, composer, conductor and arranger
Patricia Goslee, M.F.A., painter, curator
Elizabeth Hand, B.A., author
John Harrington, B.A. 1990, photographer, author
Maryann Karinch, B.A., 1974, M.A., 1979, author
Peter Kwasniewski, writer
Hank Levy, M.M., composer, notable for composition used in the 2014 film Whiplash
Nick Lowe, comic book editor
Paul Neebe, Ph.D., classical trumpeter
Father Norman O'Connor (1921–2003), priest, jazz music aficionado, writer, radio and TV show host
Marjorie Perloff, M.A. 1956, Ph.D. 1965, poetry scholar and critic
Martin Puryear, B.A. 1963, sculptor and recipient of the MacArthur Fellowship
Jim Self, M.M., 1972, classical tubist
Don Shirley, composer and pianist, on whom the Oscar-winning movie Green Book was based
John Vachon, photographer
Marion Verhaalen, composer and musicologist
Rolande Maxwell Young, composer

Business
Robert Craves, B.A. 1965, co-founder of Costco and College Success Foundation
Alfonso Fanjul Sr. (1909-1980), Cuban sugar baron
Nessa Feddis, J.D., lobbyist, vice president and senior counsel to the American Bankers Association
Edward M. Liddy, B.A. 1968, CEO of American Insurance Group
Tarek Saab, B.E.E. 2001, contestant on the 5th season of NBC's The Apprentice
Joseph A. Unanue, B.M.E. 1950, CEO of Goya Foods

Education

Sanford Berman, M.S. 1961, radical librarian
Mary Daly, M.A., radical feminist theologian and advocate of parthenogenesis
James W. Dean Jr., B.A., President of the University of New Hampshire
Peter M. Donohue, O.S.A., M.A. 1983, President, Villanova University
Brother Patrick Ellis, F.S.C., President, La Salle University
Andrew Gonzalez, M.A., President of De La Salle University
Euphemia Haynes, first African American woman to earn a Ph.D. in mathematics
Mark A. Heckler, M.F.A 1979, President, Valparaiso University
Theodore Hesburgh, CSC, S.T.D. 1945, President Emeritus of the University of Notre Dame
Joseph L. Levesque, S.T.D. 1977, President of Niagara University
W. Wesley McDonald, author of Russell Kirk and the Age of Ideology
Jesse Mann, Ph.D., 1958, professor emeritus of philosophy at Georgetown University
Kenneth Ozmon, M.A. 1963, President of Mount Allison University
Judith C. Russell, M.L.S. Current Dean of the University of Florida Library System
Charles C. Tansill (1890-1964), Professor of History
Gary Vena, M.A., Professor of English and Drama at Manhattan College
Spiro Zavos, M.A. 1967, Australasian historian, journalist and writer

Civil Law
Kathleen Abernathy, J.D. 1983, Commissioner of the Federal Communications Commission
Alice S. Fisher, J.D. Assistant Attorney General and head, United States Department of Justice Criminal Division
Arthur J. Gajarsa, M.A. 1964, Circuit Judge on the United States Court of Appeals for the Federal Circuit
James J. Hayden, J.D. Dean of the Columbus School of Law 1941–1954; maternal grandfather of Jerome Powell, Chair of the Federal Reserve
Colleen Kollar-Kotelly, B.A. 1965, J.D. 1968, Judge, United States District Court for the District of Columbia and presiding judge of the Foreign Intelligence Surveillance Court
Joseph F. Leeson, Jr., J.D. 1980, Judge, United States District Court for the Eastern District of Pennsylvania
John T. Noonan, Jr., M.A. 1948, Ph.D. 1951, Senior Judge on the United States Court of Appeals for the Ninth Circuit
Peggy Quince, J.D. 1975, Chief Justice of the Florida Supreme Court and first African-American woman to sit on that bench

Canon Law
Edward N. Peters, J.C.D. 1991, Referendary of the Supreme Tribunal of the Apostolic Signatura

Science and engineering
 Norman L. Crabill, BAE, 1949, developed patents for rocket vehicle control system and automated weather systems for pilots
Hugh Everett, 1953, physicist who first proposed the many-worlds interpretation of quantum physics
Nelly Garzón Alarcón (1932-2019), Colombian nurse, teacher
Michael D. Griffin, NASA Administrator
Marie Inez Hilger (1891-1977), Benedictine nun and anthropologist
Charles Kaman, B.A. 1940, aviation pioneer and founder of Kaman Aircraft
Daniel R. Mulville, Ph.D. Structural Engineering 1974, NASA's Chief Engineer and Acting Administrator of NASA in 2001
Nancy H. Nielsen, Ph.D. 1969, in microbiology, elected to National Academy of Medicine
Rev. Julius Nieuwland, C.S.C., Ph.D. 1904, discoverer of synthetic rubber
Joseph Weber, Ph.D. 1951, developed the first gravitational wave detectors and first suggested the use of laser interferometry in the field
Marguerite Thomas Williams, Ph.D. 1942, first African American to earn a Ph.D. in geology

Athletics
Bill Adamaitis, player for the Washington Redskins
Michael Bidwill, principal owner, chairman, and president of the Arizona Cardinals
Brian Cashman, B.A. 1989, Senior Vice-president and General Manager, New York Yankees
Tim Connelly, B.A. 1999, General Manager of the Denver Nuggets of the National Basketball Association
Frank Coonelly, J.D., President of the Pittsburgh Pirates
Dan Freeman, B.A. 2011, Head Coach Albertus Magnus Baseball
Bryson Fonville, B.A., 2016, player for the Texas Legends
Marty Hurney, B.A., 1978, American football administrator and executive
Bill Lajousky, NFL player
Mike Lonergan, B.A. 1988, Head Men's Basketball Coach, George Washington University
Jimmy Patsos, B.A. 1989, men's basketball head coach, Siena College
Wally Pipp, A.B. 1914, first baseman, New York Yankees

Other
Carl Amery, German writer
Thomas Berry, Ph.D., cultural historian and ecotheologian
Thea Bowman, Catholic nun, teacher and scholar
Francis P. Duffy, Ph.D., military chaplain, war hero, and namesake of Time Square's Duffy Square
Patrick Fahey, OSA, Prior Provincial of the Australian Province of the Order of St Augustine
Daveed Gartenstein-Ross, Ph.D., security analyst
Charles Kekumano, Ph.D.
Robert McCulloch, missionary in Pakistan for 33 years
John T. Tozzi, Ph.D., U.S. Coast Guard Rear Admiral
Miguel Vila Luna, Dominican artist and architect; designed a National Heritage building

Faculty
 Clyde Cowan, co-discoverer of the neutrino
 Cardinal Avery Dulles, taught theology 1974-1988
 Chorbishop John D. Faris, Maronite canon lawyer
 Msgr. Joseph Clifford Fenton, peritus to Cardinal Alfredo Ottaviani at the Second Vatican Council
 Regina Flannery Herzfeld, first laywoman on CUA faculty; first woman department head at CUA (anthropology)
 Father Gilbert Hartke, O.P.
Michael Hendricks, psychologist, suicidologist, and an advocate for the LGBT community
 Theo Holm, botanist
 Oleg Kalugin, former KGB spy
 Walter Kerr, dramatist and theater critic
 Frederick Joseph Kinsman, ecclesiastical historian
 Douglas Kmiec, Legal Counsel to President Ronald Reagan; United States Ambassador to Malta; faith advisor to President Barack Obama; served as Dean and St. Thomas More Professor, Columbus School of Law
 Theodore Litovitz, physicist and inventor
 Wayne Millner (1913–1976), American football player
 Venerable Archbishop Fulton J. Sheen, JCB, 1920, Auxiliary Bishop of New York and Bishop of Rochester, host of Life is Worth Living, faculty from 1926 to 1950 in theology and philosophy
 George P. Smith II, bioethics scholar, prolific writer
 Monsignor Robert Sokolowski, philosopher
 Cardinal Luis Antonio Tagle, Archbishop of the Roman Catholic Archdiocese of Manila 
 Monsignor John F. Wippel, Thomas Aquinas scholar
 Karl Herzfeld, physics
 Risteard De Hindeberg, Irish language scholar
 Venigalla Rao, professor of biology

References

 
Catholic University
Catholic University of America people